The 2014 Rabobank 7-Dorpenomloop Aalburg is a one-day women's cycle race held in the Netherlands on 31 May 2014. The race had a UCI rating of 1.2.

Results

See also
 2014 in women's road cycling

References

Rabobank 7 Dorpenomloop Aalburg
7-Dorpenomloop Aalburg
Rabobank 7 Dorpenomloop Aalburg